Psilogamasus is a genus of mites in the family Parasitidae.

Species
 Psilogamasus hurlbutti Athias-Henriot, 1969

References

Parasitidae